Stuart Lucas Saunders (born 27 June 1960 in Hobart, Tasmania) was an Australian cricket player, who played for the Tasmanian Tigers. He was a Right-handed batsman and right arm leg break bowler who represented Tasmania from 1979 until 1989.

See also
 List of Tasmanian representative cricketers

External links
Cricinfo Profile

1960 births
Living people
Australian cricketers
Tasmania cricketers
Cricketers from Hobart